CSF Spartanii Selemet  is a Moldovan football club based in Selemet, Moldova. They play in the Moldovan "A" Division, the second-level division of Moldovan football.

Honours
Divizia B
Winners (2): 2015–16, 2018

References

External links
 
CSF Spartanii Selemet on Soccerway

Cimișlia District
Football clubs in Moldova
Association football clubs established in 2011